Steve Bennett is a British gemstone expert, who has since focused on the health industry serial entrepreneur. He is known for his online shopping businesses.

Early life and education 

Bennett grew up in Birmingham, where he learned to sail and play the saxophone and guitar. He also studied geology. He was a poor student during his secondary education, but later completed a computer training course.

Career 

As a young man, Bennett worked in a number of office based computer roles. After losing his job, he set up his own UK company selling computers and later software. This small enterprise later became Software Warehouse, and grew to be a 30 store retail chain in the 1990s. Bennett sold the company in 2000.

With the advent of the internet, Bennett established jungle.com which he later sold for £37 million at the height of the dotcom boom.

Bennet started several more e-commerce, retail and entertainment companies. He set up jewelry retailer Gems TV in 2004 and The Genuine Gemstone Company in 2007. The company employs about 500 staff members. In 2012 Genuine Gemstone was named to the Fast Track 100 list of fastest growing privately held companies.

In 2014 the company operates several brands, including Gems TV, a broadcast shopping channel; Rocks TV, which is shown on DirecTV and Dish TV; Gemporia.com, an ecommerce website which hosts live auction rooms and an online television show The Lounge; Jewellery Maker, a television channel and associated e-commerce website for jewellery making hobbyists; NOWSEEN.com, a fashion focused website aimed at a younger audience; and  Gem Collector.com, an e-commerce website which sells loose gemstones.

Bennett sold his shares in 2006, the year the company floated on the SGX stock exchange. Apparently at that time he was effectively sacked from the business he had started. Four years later he bought the company back, by which time it was experiencing declining sales. He restored the company and in 2012 won the Fasttrack 100, as the fastest growing privately owned business in the UK. He then sold Jewellery maker in 2015 to immediate Media and again bought it back in December 2019. In December 2017, The Bennett family transferred 75% of the ownership of their companies to their employees.

He is an explorer who has successfully walked to the North Pole, sailed across the Atlantic with his young family and climbed several mountains. In 2020 along with his son-in-law, Olympian James Cracknell and several doctors, ran 100 miles in 5 days on ZERO calorie intake.

In 2018 he wrote a health book named Primal Cure and the following year launched a health business under the same name. This was later rebranded to Primal Living. In December 2019 he self-published a further health book called Fat and Furious which was co-written with 23 doctors and experts and is a not for profit book.

Along with his family he established the Colourful Life Foundation in 2011 of which Richard Branson is the patron. The charity has built more than 15 schools across India, Tanzania and South Africa. He also co-founded HealthResults.com with Dr Campbell Murdoch with a mission to help 1 million people in the UK to reverse their type 2 diabetes. .

Awards and Accolades 

 1996- Software Warehouse wins 3i Quest for Growth for the Midlands
 1997- Software Warehouse wins the first ever Fast Track 100.
 1999- Software Warehouse wins Retailer of the Year, sponsored by PC Direct
 2000- Steve Bennett named Runner up Ernst & Young Entrepreneur of the Year
 2012- The Genuine Gemstone Company tops Sunday Times Fast Track 100
 2013- Steve Bennett wins Ernst & Young Midlands Entrepreneur of the Year 
 2013- Steve Bennett wins Ernst & Young UK Turnaround Entrepreneur of the Year
 2013- The Genuine Gemstone Company wins Jewellery Retailer of the Year
 2013- The Genuine Gemstone Company places sixth in Sunday Times Fast Track 100

References

External links 

Twitter
The Genuine Gemstone Company
Gemporia (Gems TV, Rocks TV)
JewelleryMaker
GemCollector
Primal Living
YouBamboo
The Colourful Life Foundation
Health Daddy

1966 births
20th-century British businesspeople
Living people